The Schiessbecher (alternatively: Schießbecher)  - literally "shooting cup" - was a German grenade launcher of World War II.

A Gewehrgranatgerät ("rifle grenade device") based on rifle grenade launcher models designed during World War I it fitted to the end of a rifle, the grenade being propelled by a special rifle cartridge. The Schiessbecher was introduced in 1942 and intended to replace all previous rifle grenade launcher models in use by German armed forces.

For these differing tasks several specialized grenades with accompanying special propelling cartridges were developed for the Schiessbecher. The rifle grenade propelling cartridges fired a wooden projectile through the barrel to the rifle grenade that upon impact automatically primed the rifle grenade.

The Schiessbecher was produced until May 1944. The total production was 1,450,114.

References

Grenade launchers
World War II infantry weapons of Germany
Rifle grenades
Weapons and ammunition introduced in 1942